The de la Vallée du Richelieu sector, is a public transit agency serving eight member municipalities and the Richelieu Valley RCM in Quebec, Canada. These towns, located east Montreal along Quebec Route 116, receive both local service and commuter runs to Exo (public transit) stations that serve Montreal. The communities served are: Beloeil, McMasterville, Mont-Saint-Hilaire, Otterburn Park, Saint-Basile-le-Grand, Saint-Hyacinthe, Sainte-Madeleine, Sainte-Marie-Madeleine. Saint-Bruno-de-Montarville was formerly a ninth CITVR member municipality, but despite leaving the system, it continues to benefit from the service.

Scheduled bus routes

RITA paratransit

See also
 Exo (public transit) bus services

References

External links
 History of Conseil Intermunicipal de Transport (CIT)
 AMT website for CIT Vallée du Richelieu

Transit agencies in Quebec
Transport in Montérégie
Companies based in Quebec
La Vallée-du-Richelieu Regional County Municipality